Donat Rrudhani (born 2 May 1999) is a Kosovan footballer who plays as a midfielder for Swiss club Young Boys and the Kosovo national team.

Club career

Early career
Rrudhani was born and raised in Kamenica, at the age of 12, he and his parents emigrated to France. Rrudhani after coming to France, joins CO Langres and where in addition to being part of CO Langres, he was also part of Troyes AC until 2016 and then part of FC Brunstatt. In 2017, he moved to Switzerland and started his senior career at Timau Basel and after a season transferred to Black Stars Basel.

Aarau
On 9 August 2019, Rrudhani signed a four-year contract with Swiss Challenge League club Aarau. His debut with Aarau came nine days later in the 2019–20 Swiss Cup first round against SC Cham after coming on as a substitute in the 103rd minute in place of Yvan Alounga.

Young Boys
On 8 June 2022, Rrudhani signed a four-year contract with Swiss Super League club Young Boys and this transfer would become legally effective in July 2022. On 16 July 2022, he was named as a Young Boys substitute for the first time in a league match against Zürich. His debut with Young Boys came five days later in the 2022–23 UEFA Europa Conference League second qualifying round against Liepāja after coming on as a substitute at 76th minute in place of Moumi Ngamaleu. Three days after debut, Rrudhani made his league debut in a 0–3 away win against Sion after coming on as a substitute at 76th minute in place of Christian Fassnacht. Four days later, he scored his first goal for Young Boys in his third appearance for the club in a 3–0 home win over Liepāja in 2022–23 UEFA Europa Conference League second qualifying round.

International career
On 31 May 2021, Rrudhani received a call-up from Kosovo for the friendly matches against Guinea and Gambia. His debut with Kosovo came eight days later in a friendly match against Guinea after being named in the starting line-up.

International goals

References

External links

1998 births
Living people
People from Kamenica, Kosovo
Kosovan footballers
Kosovo international footballers
Kosovan expatriate footballers
Kosovan expatriate sportspeople in Switzerland
Association football midfielders
2. Liga Interregional players
Swiss Promotion League players
FC Black Stars Basel players
Swiss Challenge League players
FC Aarau players
Swiss Super League players
BSC Young Boys players